John Brown  was an English footballer who played as a centre forward for Rochdale in the 1922–23 season.

References

Rochdale A.F.C. players
Preston North End F.C. players
Ashton National F.C. players
Manchester North End F.C. players
English footballers
Footballers from Manchester
Association footballers not categorized by position